Thondarayampadi is a village in the Thanjavur taluk of Thanjavur district, Tamil Nadu, India.

Demographics 

As per the 2001 census, Thittai had a total population of 1164 with 586 males and 578 females. The sex ratio was 986. The literacy rate was 70.56.

References 

 

Villages in Thanjavur district